Factory Shop may refer to:

 The Original Factory Shop, a chain of department stores in the United Kingdom
 An outlet store